Stolen Life is a Bulgarian medical drama series that airs on NOVA, created by Evtim Miloshev directed by Zornitsa Sofia and Peter Valchanov and produced by Alexander Hristov, Evtim Miloshev, Gabriel Georgiev and Ivan Spassov. Participating actors are Stoyan Alexiev, Maria Kavardjikova, Alexander Alexiev, Ianina Kasheva, Ioana Bukovska-Davidova, Emil Markov, Radina Dumanyan, Dimo Alexiev, Vasil Banov, Martina Vachkova, Milena Jivkova and others.

Series overview

Cast and characters 
 Filip Bukov - Dr. Hadzihristev (9-11)
 Evgeni Budinov - Dr. Emil Petmezov (8-11)
 Liubomira Basheva - Dr. Nora Chilingirova (8-11)
 Ivan Yrukov - Dr. Deian Tabakov (7-8)
 Gergana Stoyanova - Dr. Poli Gruncharova (7-11)
 Vladimir Karamazov - Hristo Karagiozov (6-9)
 Vladimir Penev - Prof. Asen Tsonev (6-11)
 Yulian Vergov - Assoc. Prof. Viktor Bankov (4,6-7)
 Dimo Aleksiev - Dr. Kalin Genadiev (1-5,8) 
 Maria Kavardzhikova - Evgenia Genadieva (1-8)
 Yanina Kasheva - Dr. Katya Krasteva (1-11) 
 Yoana Bukovska-Davidova - Violeta Zaharieva (1-4) 
 Emil Markov - Assoc. Prof. Petar Zahariev (1-11) 
 Milena Zhivkova-Geraskova - Dr. Elena Romanova (1-11)
 Diana Dimitrova - Dr. Zornitsa Ognyanova (4-11)
 Velislav Pavlov - Dr. Mario Kovachev (5-6,8-11)
 Dimitar Zahariev - Dr. Anton Kovachev (5-6) 
 Martina Vachkova - Zhekova (1-11) 
 Angelina Slavova - Neneva (1-11) 
 Ralitsa Paskaleva - Dr. Galia Stiliyanova (graduate AG) (1-9)
 Daria Simeonova - Nataliya Pavlova (1-5) 
 Desislava Bakardzhieva - Dr. Lora Hinova (1-11)
 Monyo Monev - Assoc. Prof. Stefan Mazov (2-11)
 Tsvyatko Tsenov - Miroslav Terziev (1-2)
 Luiza Grigorova - Dr. Vyara Dobreva (3-4)
 Naum Shopov Jr. - Dr. Boris Tasev (3-11)
 Krasimir Dokov - Yanko Vasilev (1-11)
 Aleksandar Aleksiev - Dr. Aleksandar Vasilev (1-3,8) 
 Radina Dumanyan - Dr. Bilyana Zaharieva (1-3,8)
 Stoyan Aleksiev - prof. Ivan Genadiev (1-3)
 Vasil Banov - prof. Georgi Kamburov (mentor Dr. Vassilev) (1-3)
 Aleksander Dimov - Dr. Vladov (1-6)
 Nikola Mutafov - Dr. Penev (1-11)
 Daniel Rashev - Dr. Martin Vrabchev (1-11)
 Tsvyatko Tsenov - Miroslav Terziev (1-2)
 Dimitar Rachkov Jr. - Koko (3-11)
 Vasil Binev - Ivo Fotev (5-11)
 Irina Miteva - Ina Foteva (5-7)
 Ernestina Shinova - Dr. Sofia Stamenova (2-10)
 Darin Angelov - Ivan Genadiev (in the 80s)
 Aleksandra Sarchadjieva - Katya Krasteva (in the 80s)
 Evgeni Budinov - Yanko Vasilev (in the 80s)
 Hristina Apostolova - Evgenia Genadieva (in the 80s)
 Joseph Shamli - Dr. Kamburov (in the 80s)

Broadcast 
The premiere of TV series in Bulgaria was on 8 March 2016, broadcast from Tuesday to Thursday from 8.00 pm to 9.00 pm on NOVA. The last 3 series are double and broadcast from 20:00 to 22:00. The final was on 2 June. A few days later they begin filming the second season, which began on 13 September with airtime at 21:00 pm. The second season ended on 14 December at 21:00.

The third season began on 20 February 2017 from Monday to Friday from 20:00 to 21:00. On 28 February episodes already broadcast from Tuesday to Friday also at 20:00.

References

External links 
 

Bulgarian television series
Medical television series
2010s Bulgarian television series
2016 Bulgarian television series debuts
Nova (Bulgarian TV channel) original programming